Matz may refer to:

First names
 Matz Sandman (born 1948), Norwegian politician
 Matz Robert Eriksson (born 1972), Swedish musician

Surnames
 Evelyn Matz (born 1955), German handballer
 Howard Matz (born 1943), American judge
 Jeff Matz (born 1977), American bass guitarist
 Johnny Matz (1892–1969), American ice hockey player
 Klaus-Dieter Matz (20th century), German handballer
 Mary Jane Phillips-Matz (1926–2013), American biographer
 Michael R. Matz (born 1951), American equestrian
 Peter Matz (1928–2002), American musician, composer, arranger and conductor
 Rudolf Matz (1901–1988), Croatian composer
 Steven Matz (born 1991), American baseball player

Places
 , a river in the French department of Oise with the following communes:
 Canny-sur-Matz
 Marest-sur-Matz
 Margny-sur-Matz
 Ressons-sur-Matz
 Roye-sur-Matz

Pseudonyms
 Yukihiro Matsumoto, Japanese computer scientist, creator of the programming language Ruby
 Alexis Nolent, French comics writer

Other
 Military Aerodrome Traffic Zone